The Stotler Limestone is a geologic formation in Kansas. It preserves fossils dating back to the Carboniferous period.

See also

 List of fossiliferous stratigraphic units in Kansas
 Paleontology in Kansas

References
 

Carboniferous Kansas
Carboniferous southern paleotropical deposits